Äitien sota is a Finnish reality series that premiered on Liv on 5 February 2015. Each episode follows three mothers, often celebrities, in their ordinary life with children and family. At the end of each episode mothers rate each other's motherly abilities and the one who gets the most points is named mother of the week.

Overview

References

External links
Äitien sota official website

Finnish reality television series
2010s Finnish television series